Matthew Paul Riley (born August 2, 1979) was an American former professional baseball pitcher. He played in Major League Baseball (MLB) for the Baltimore Orioles and the Texas Rangers.

Baseball career
He attended Sacramento City College. Riley was drafted by the Baltimore Orioles in the third round of the  draft. He dominated for the Delmarva Shorebirds of the South Atlantic League at age 18, having an earned run average of 1.19 and 136 strikeouts in 83 innings pitched. It was there that his curveball started becoming known as one of the best in the Orioles' organization at the time. He earned a callup to the Orioles in 1999, and though his ERA in three starts there was 7.36, he was still highly regarded by the Orioles due to his minor-league achievements that year. However, in 2000, he made only two starts for the Rochester Red Wings (then the Orioles' Triple-A affiliate), giving up 11 earned runs in 7 innings. He spent the rest of that season and the  season recovering from his first Tommy John surgery.

He went 4-10 at Bowie, with an ERA of 6.34. The  season was the first season that he began in the majors, but he struggled there. In 14 appearances (13 starts), he logged a 3-4 record and a 5.62 ERA, and he was also sent back to Ottawa for ten starts.

He was able to play briefly in the major leagues for Texas, but as a one-out middle reliever rather than a starter. He accumulated an ERA of 9.95 over seven games and was then sent down to the Triple-A Oklahoma RedHawks. In July 2005, he had his second Tommy John surgery and missed the rest of the 2005 season. While attempting to come back from that surgery, he retore his ulnar collateral ligament and had to have a third Tommy John surgery on his left elbow.

In , Riley played for the Las Vegas 51s and Jacksonville Suns in the Los Angeles Dodgers minor league system. Riley was released by the Dodgers on July 24, .

After not playing baseball in 2009, Riley played for two independent league teams in 2010 — the Orange County Flyers and the York Revolution.  He then retired from the game.

Personal life
Matt married Tiffany Hayward on January 14, 2006. They have 2 daughters together and reside in Tennessee.

References

External links
, or The Baseball Cube

1979 births
Living people
Algodoneros de Guasave players
American expatriate baseball players in Mexico
American expatriate baseball players in Canada
Arizona League Rangers players
Baltimore Orioles players
Baseball players from California
Bowie Baysox players
Delmarva Shorebirds players
Frederick Keys players
Jacksonville Suns players
Las Vegas 51s players
Leones del Caracas players
American expatriate baseball players in Venezuela
Major League Baseball pitchers
Oklahoma RedHawks players
Orange County Flyers players
Ottawa Lynx players
People from Antioch, California
Rochester Red Wings players
Sacramento City Panthers baseball players
Texas Rangers players
York Revolution players